The Vincent Timsit Workshop, also known as VÉTÉ, is a complex designed by Jean-François Zevaco in Casablanca, Morocco in 1952. The complex contains workshops for the Vincent Timsit company, which was originally involved in mirror-making and locksmithing industries, as well as office space and an apartment. It is one of Jean-François Zevaco's most celebrated works, and it is considered an emblematic feature of the architecture of Casablanca.

Architecture 
In his design for the Vincent Timsit Workshop, Zevaco drew inspiration from Oscar Niemeyer with his use of flying parabolic arches.

Gallery

References 

Buildings and structures in Casablanca
Modernist architecture
Industrial buildings